Gretna is a city in Sarpy County, Nebraska, United States. The population was 4,441 at the 2010 census.

History
Gretna started shortly after the Burlington Railroad built a short line between Omaha and Ashland in the summer of 1886. Advent of the village of Gretna on this new laid rail line was the cue for the exit of the nearby trading post of Forest City, which had existed since 1856. In its day, Forest City, located 2.5 miles southwest of where Gretna now stands, was a flourishing and busy place, but it was doomed by the rail road which passed it by. The only marker that exists today to show the site of old Forest City is the cemetery (Holy Sepulcher) which is located a little to the east of what was the center of activity in the settlement. Names that were prominent in the beginnings of Forest City were the families of William Langdon, John Thomas and John Conner.

The Lincoln Land Company, recognizing the potential of the site, surveyed and platted the town site of Gretna in 1887. The village was incorporated by July 10, 1889. The name suggests Scotland's Gretna Green, the ancestral county of some of the earliest settlers.

Geography

Demographics

2010 census
As of the census of 2010, there were 4,441 people, 1,594 households, and 1,139 families living in the city. The racial makeup of the city was 97.4% White, 0.6% African American, 0.1% Native American, 0.5% Asian, 0.3% from other races, and 1.1% from two or more races. Hispanic or Latino of any race were 1.6% of the population.

There were 1,594 households, of which 43.8% had children under the age of 18 living with them, 56.7% were married couples living together, 11.2% had a female householder with no husband present, 3.6% had a male householder with no wife present, and 28.5% were non-families. 24.5% of all households were made up of individuals, and 10.1% had someone living alone who was 65 years of age or older. The average household size was 2.72 and the average family size was 3.29.

The median age in the city was 34.5 years. 31.7% of residents were under the age of 18; 5.8% were between the ages of 18 and 24; 28.7% were from 25 to 44; 21.4% were from 45 to 64; and 12.4% were 65 years of age or older. The gender makeup of the city was 49.0% male and 51.0% female.

2000 census
As of the census of 2000, there were 2,355 people, 889 households, and 642 families living in the city. The population density was 1,996.2 people per square mile (770.6/km). There were 917 housing units at an average density of 777.3 per square mile (300.0/km). The racial makeup of the city was 98.64% White, 0.04% African American, 0.42% Native American, 0.42% Asian, 0.17% from other races, and 0.30% from two or more races. Hispanic or Latino of any race were 1.15% of the population.

There were 889 households, out of which 38.1% had children under the age of 18 living with them, 58.0% were married couples living together, 11.6% had a female householder with no husband present, and 27.7% were non-families. 23.5% of all households were made up of individuals, and 10.0% had someone living alone who was 65 years of age or older. The average household size was 2.59 and the average family size was 3.07.

The median age in the city was 36 years.  28.1% of the population was under the age of 18, 8.3% were aged from 18 to 24, 28.6% from 25 to 44, 21.9% from 45 to 64, and 13.0% were 65 years of age or older. For every 100 females, there were 89.9 males. For every 100 females age 18 and over, there were 86.2 males.

As of 2000 the median income for a household in the city was $50,112, and the median income for a family was $56,410. Males had a median income of $37,868 versus $27,569 for females. The per capita income for the city was $21,729. About 2.3% of families and 3.6% of the population were below the poverty line, including 3.4% of those under age 18 and none of those age 65 or over.

Education

Bond issues
Gretna Public Schools has passed several bond issues to build new facilities. Gretna's school bonds have become the third highest bond levy tax burden for property owners in the state. Gretna has a bond levy of 0.33456, with only Bennington and Elkhorn ranking higher, each with a bond levy of .34.

2022 School Board Elections
In 2022 Gretna Public Schools had an influx of candidates file for candidacy for the 2022 election. Ten candidates were on the ballot with the primary election being May 10, 2022.

Notable people
Andy Janovich, professional football player

See also
Nebraska Crossing Outlets

References

External links
 City of Gretna
 Gretna Chamber of Commerce

Cities in Nebraska
Cities in Sarpy County, Nebraska
Populated places established in 1886
1886 establishments in Nebraska